Walton on the Hill railway station was located on the Huskisson branch of the North Liverpool Extension Line at the junction of Rice Lane and Queens Drive in Walton, Liverpool, England.

The station opened on 1 December 1879. It closed to passengers on 1 January 1918 but continued as a public goods station for a further fifty years, closing completely on 9 September 1968. The through tracks were not lifted until 1980.

References

Sources

External links
 The station via Disused Stations UK
 Station on a 1948 O.S. map via npe Maps
 Station on an 1888 OSmap overlay via National Library of Scotland
 Station and line HUS via railwaycodes
 Railtours via sixbellsjunction

Disused railway stations in Liverpool
Former Cheshire Lines Committee stations
Railway stations in Great Britain opened in 1879
Railway stations in Great Britain closed in 1918